The Church of Jesus Christ of Latter-day Saints in Texas refers to the Church of Jesus Christ of Latter-day Saints (LDS Church) and its members in Texas. Official church membership as a percentage of general population was 1.13% in 2007 and 1.21% in 2014.  According to the 2014 Pew Forum on Religion & Public Life survey in both years, roughly 1% of Texans self-identify themselves most closely with the LDS Church.

Texas has the 5th most members of the LDS Church in the United States, and the most members east of the Rocky Mountains. The LDS Church is the 6th largest denomination in Texas.

History

2008 Hurricane Ike
In response to Hurricane Ike in 2008, members of the LDS Church across Texas and other parts of the country volunteered relief and service.

Total LDS Church response to Hurricane Ike included:
 80,640 hygiene kits (six truckloads).
 8.064 cleaning kits (four truckloads).
 4 truckloads of water.
 11,520 blankets (two truckloads).
 4,800 food boxes (four truckloads) which included rice, vegetable oil, peanut butter, fruit drink mix, and assorted canned goods. Each food box could feed a family of four for a week to 10 days.
 Food, water, generators, sleeping bags, tools, chain saws, tarps and other items.

In addition to this aid, thousands of church members came into the area as volunteers to assist in clean up efforts.

Church units and creation dates

Stakes 

Note: While some temple districts contain stakes located outside Texas, only the stakes in Texas are listed. Furthermore, several congregations in Texas are in stakes headquartered outside of Texas; however, these are not listed.

Dallas Texas Temple District, October 19, 1984 
 Dallas Texas Stake, October 18, 1953
 Fort Worth Texas Stake, September 24, 1967
 Longview Texas Stake, November 9, 1969
 Plano Texas Stake, May 27, 1973
 Hurst Texas Stake, November 14, 1976
 Dallas Texas East Stake, May 15, 1977
 Lewisville Texas Stake, April 12, 1981
 Gilmer Texas Stake, January 16, 1983
 Richardson Texas Stake, January 30, 1983
 Arlington Texas Stake, April 13, 1986
 Denton Texas Stake, May 3, 1992
 McKinney Texas Stake, September 11, 1994 
 Colleyville Texas Stake, April 13, 1997
 Carrollton Texas Stake, December 9, 2001
 Tyler Texas Stake, January 22, 2005
 Weatherford Texas Stake, April 30, 2006
 Allen Texas Stake, August 26, 2007
 Frisco Texas Stake, May 4, 2008
 Waco Texas Stake, October 17, 2010
 Heath Texas Stake, May 20, 2012
 Alliance Texas Stake, February 16, 2014
 Frisco Texas Shawnee Trail Stake, May 4, 2014 (Renamed to Prosper Texas Stake,  August 25, 2019)
 Irving Texas Stake, February 7, 2016
 Sherman Texas Stake, March 20, 2016
 Burleson Texas Stake, September 11, 2016
 Fort Worth Texas North Stake, November 6, 2016
 Little Elm Texas Stake, August 25, 2019

Ciudad Juárez Mexico Temple District, February 26, 2000 
 El Paso Texas Stake, September 21, 1952
 El Paso Texas Mount Franklin Stake, August 29, 1982
 El Paso Texas Chamizal Stake, January 17, 2016

Houston Texas Temple District, August 26, 2000 
 Houston Texas Stake, October 11, 1953
 Beaumont Texas Stake, September 3, 1961
 Houston Texas East Stake, May 5, 1968
 Houston Texas North Stake, November 16, 1975
 Friendswood Texas Stake, May 29, 1977
 College Station Texas Stake, October 28, 1979
 Houston Texas South Stake, November 30, 1980
 Kingwood Texas Stake, April 18, 1982
 Orange Texas Stake, August 29, 1982
 Cypress Texas Stake, November 6, 1983
 Bay City Texas Stake, October 13, 1991
 Katy Texas Stake, December 1, 1991
 Klein Texas Stake, November 2, 2003
 Houston Texas West Stake, January 8, 2006
 Richmond Texas Stake, May 7, 2006
 League City Texas Stake, October 25, 2009
 Spring Texas Stake, November 8, 2009
 Houston Texas Summerwood Stake, June 3, 2012
 The Woodlands Texas Stake, October 12, 2014
 Houston Texas Bear Creek Stake, February 22, 2015 (Renamed to Bridgeland Texas Stake, August 22, 2021)
 Conroe Texas Stake, April 30, 2017
 Tomball Texas Stake, May 21, 2017

Lubbock Texas Temple District, April 21, 2002 
 Lubbock Texas Stake, November 26, 1967
 Odessa Texas Stake, December 15, 1968
 Abilene Texas Stake, May 3, 1981
 Amarillo Texas Stake, May 31, 1981
 Fort Stockton Texas District, September 7, 2003
 Lubbock Texas North Stake, September 14, 2014

San Antonio Texas Temple District, May 22, 2005 
 San Antonio Texas Stake, January 19, 1958 
 Corpus Christi Texas Stake, May 31, 1964
 Austin Texas Stake, October 14, 1973
 McAllen Texas Stake, May 4, 1975
 San Antonio Texas East Stake,May 30, 1976
 Killeen Texas Stake, November 26, 1978
 Harlingen Texas Stake, March 22, 1981
 San Antonio Texas West Stake, June 5, 1983
 Austin Texas Oak Hills Stake, December 1, 1991
 Laredo Texas District, October 31, 1995 (Organized as Laredo Texas Stake, December 2, 2018)
 Eagle Pass Texas District, October 19, 1997
 San Antonio Texas North Stake, October 19, 1997
 Round Rock Texas Stake, June 6, 1999
 San Antonio Texas Hill Country Stake, January 27, 2008
 Kyle Texas Stake, May 4, 2008
 McAllen Texas West Stake, September 7, 2008
 Round Rock Texas East Stake, November 24, 2013
 San Antonio Texas Cibolo Valley Stake, January 10, 2016
 San Antonio Texas La Cantera Stake, January 24, 2016
 Cedar Park Texas Stake, June 5, 2016
 Austin Texas West Stake, September 15, 2019
 San Antonio Texas Pecan Valley Stake, September 13, 2020

Missions 
 Texas Dallas West Mission, February 16, 1961 *
 Texas San Antonio Mission, December 10, 1967 *
 Texas Houston Mission, July 3, 1976
 Texas Fort Worth Mission, July 1, 1986 *
 Texas McAllen Mission, July 1, 1989 *
 Texas Houston East Mission, July 1, 1990
 Texas Houston South Mission, July 1, 1997
 Texas Lubbock Mission, July 1, 2002
 Texas Austin Mission, July 1, 2020
 Texas Dallas East Mission, July 1, 2020
Responsibility for Texas has been shared by several different missions.  Originally in the Southern States Mission, it was transferred to the Indian Territory Mission, which later changed its name to the Southwestern States Mission and, in 1904, it became the Central States Mission.  Texas remained in the Central States Mission until the Texas Mission was organized in 1931.  Texas and Louisiana were combined to form the Texas-Louisiana Mission in 1945.  Texas was part of the Gulf States Mission from 1955 to 1960.

In 1961, a new Texas Mission was organized. This became the Texas Dallas Mission in 1974.  As the church grew, other missions in Texas were organized.
 The Texas Dallas West Mission was originally named the Texas Mission in 1961.  It was renamed the Texas North Mission on June 10, 1970, the Texas Dallas Mission on June 20, 1974, and ultimately the Texas Dallas West Mission on July 1, 2020.
 The Texas San Antonio Mission was originally named the Texas South Mission in 1967.  It was renamed the Texas San Antonio Mission on June 20, 1974.
 The Texas Fort Worth Mission was originally named the Texas Lubbock Mission in 1986. It was renamed the Texas Fort Worth Mission on January 20, 1988.
 The Texas McAllen Mission was originally named the Texas Corpus Christi Mission in 1989. It was renamed the Texas McAllen Mission on February 24, 1994.

Temples

As of October 2022, Texas has 4 temples located in the state, with 1 under construction, and 3 more announced. The far western portion of the state is located in the Ciudad Juárez Mexico Temple District. A few congregations in and around Wichita Falls, TX are in the Lawton Oklahoma Stake and are part of the Oklahoma City Oklahoma Temple District.

Communities 
Latter-day Saints have had a significant role in establishing and settling communities within the "Mormon Corridor" and other locations, including the following in Texas:
 Enoch
 Kelsey

See also

 The Church of Jesus Christ of Latter-day Saints membership statistics (United States)
 Religion in Texas

Notes

References
 Michael Scott Van Wagenen, The Texas Republic and the Mormon Kingdom of God, 2002
 B.H. Roberts, Comprehensive History of the Church, v.2, 1912
 Melvin C. Johnsin, Polygamy on the Pedernales: Lyman Wight's Mormon Village in Antebellum Texas, 2006

External links
 Newsroom (Texas)
 ComeUntoChrist.org Latter-day Saints Visitor site
 The Church of Jesus Christ of Latter-day Saints Official site

Latter Day Saint movement in Texas